Aladdin and His Wonderful Lamp is a 1964 pantomime cast album by Cliff Richard, the Shadows, the Norrie Paramor orchestra and other members of the pantomime cast. It is Richard's twelfth album.
The album reached number 13 in the UK Album Charts in a 5-week run in the top 20.

Two singles were released from the album within a week of each other in December 1964. First, the Shadows' "Genie with the Light Brown Lamp", which reached number 17 in the UK Singles Chart, followed by Richard's "I Could Easily Fall (In Love with You)" (with the Shadows backing), reaching number 6 on the same chart.

Track listing
"Emperor Theme"/"Chinese Street Scene" - Norrie Paramor and his Orchestra
"Me Oh My" - The Shadows
"I Could Easily Fall (In Love with You)" - Cliff Richard and The Shadows
"Little Princess" - The Shadows
"This was My Special Day" - Faye Fisher, Joan Palethorpe, Audrey Bayley, Cliff Richard, Norrie Paramor and his Orchestra
"I'm in Love With You" - Cliff Richard and The Shadows, Norrie Paramor and his Orchestra
"There's Gotta Be a Way" - Cliff Richard, Norrie Paramor and his Orchestra
"Ballet" - Norrie Paramor and his Orchestra
"Dance of the Warriors" - Norrie Paramor and his Orchestra
"Friends" - Cliff Richard and The Shadows, Norrie Paramor and his Orchestra
"Dragon Dance" - Norrie Paramor and his Orchestra
"Genie with the Light Brown Lamp" - The Shadows
"Make Ev'ry Day a Carnival Day" - Cliff Richard, Norrie Paramor and his Orchestra
"Widow Twanky's Song" - Michael Samms, Charles Granville, Norrie Paramor And His Orchestra
"I'm Feeling Oh So Lonely" - Faye Fisher, Joan Palethorpe, Audrey Bayley, Norrie Paramor and his Orchestra
"I've Said Too Many Things" - Cliff Richard and The Shadows, Norrie Paramor and his Orchestra
"Evening Comes" - Cliff Richard and The Shadows, Norrie Paramor And his Orchestra
"Havin' Fun" - Cliff Richard and The Shadows

Personnel
Taken from the sleeve notes:

 Cliff Richard - Lead vocals
 Norrie Paramor - producer, arranger and conductor
 Norrie Paramor orchestra
 Faye Fisher - vocals
 Joan Palethorpe - vocals
 Audrey Bayley - vocals
 Mike Sammes Singers - backing vocals
The Shadows:
 Hank Marvin - lead guitar, backing vocals
 Bruce Welch - rhythm guitar, backing vocals
 John Rostill - bass guitar
 Brian Bennett - drums

Music and lyrics by the Shadows.

References

1964 albums
Cliff Richard albums
Albums produced by Norrie Paramor
EMI Columbia Records albums